Clifton Reginald Wharton Sr. (May 11, 1899 – April 25, 1990) was an American diplomat, and the first African American diplomat to become an ambassador by rising through the ranks of the Foreign Service rather than by political appointment such as Frederick Douglass. He also became the first black Foreign Service Officer to become chief of a diplomatic mission.

Life

Born in Baltimore, Wharton received his law degree in 1920 and an advanced law degree in 1923 from Boston University School of Law. He practiced in Boston before joining the United States State Department as a law clerk in the Career United States Foreign Service. Wharton went on to be Vice Consul in Monrovia (1927–1929), Consul in Las Palmas (1932–1938), Minister to Romania (1958–1961) and Ambassador to Norway (1961–1964).

Wharton died in Phoenix, Arizona.

Wharton was a member of Alpha Phi Alpha fraternity.

In 1978, the State Department had a day honoring him and diplomat Lucile Atcherson Curtis, who was the first woman in what became the U.S. Foreign Service.

On May 30, 2006, the United States Postal Service issued a stamp depicting Wharton in its Distinguished American Diplomats commemorative series.

Family
He married Harriet Banks; they had three children.
His son Clifton Reginald Wharton Jr. is a noted economist and executive who also served in the State Department as Deputy Secretary of State during the Clinton administration, and before that as president of Michigan State University.

See also
 Rogers Act

References

External links
https://web.archive.org/web/20150724035343/http://diplomacy.state.gov/discoverdiplomacy/explorer/peoplehistorical/170207.htm

1899 births
1990 deaths
Ambassadors of the United States to Romania
Ambassadors of the United States to Norway
Boston University School of Law alumni
African-American diplomats
United States Foreign Service personnel
People from Baltimore
20th-century African-American people
20th-century American diplomats